Miku Expo is a series of world tours organized by Crypton Future Media starring the virtual singing software character Hatsune Miku. The performances include notable user-created Vocaloid songs and digital choreography of Miku dancing, projected onto glass screens.

History

2010s
Miku Expo 2014 was held in Jakarta, Indonesia and the United States, specifically in Los Angeles and New York City. The theme song for the tour was "Sharing The World", produced by Bighead.

Miku Expo 2015 was held on June 26–27 in Shanghai, China.

Miku Expo 2016 was held in Japan on March 23-April 10, North America on April 23-June 5, Taiwan on June 25 and 26, and in China on December 3 and 4 in Shanghai, and 10 and 11 in Beijing. Anamanaguchi was the opening act for the North American tour.

Miku Expo 2017 was held on December 16 in Kuala Lumpur, Malaysia.

Miku Expo 2018 was held from June 29 until July 19 in the United States and Mexico, and on December 1 until 8 in Paris, France, Cologne, Germany, and London, England.

Miku Expo 2019 was held on May 11 in Taiwan and on July 27 in Hong Kong.

2020s
Miku Expo 2020 took place in Europe in January 11–28, in London, Paris, Berlin, Amsterdam, and Barcelona. A USA & Canada tour was originally scheduled to take place in April and May, but it was postponed to the following year after initially rescheduling to September-October, and later cancelled due to the COVID-19 pandemic.

In October 2020, a virtual livestream performance online was announced and funded by a Kickstarter crowdfunding campaign that ran for 2 months starting on November 12, 2020 and raised over ¥60,000,000, more than double its intended target of ¥25,000,000  and took place on June 6.

Miku Expo Rewind was held on June 5, 2022. Unlike previous years, this event rather consists of a specially-curated compilation of performances of songs that were recorded at past HATSUNE MIKU EXPO concerts, many of which have not been released beforehand. In addition, a variety of online sub-events, exhibitions, and workshops were also held in conjunction with the event. A second online event, "Miku Expo Rewind+" was also held on November 6 of the same year. Miku Expo VR is additionally planned to take place in mid-2023.

See also

 List of J-pop concerts held outside Asia
 Hatsune Miku

References

External links 
 


Concert tours of Japan
Japanese popular culture